Célia Bourgeois (born 9 June 1983) is a French cross-country skier who has competed since 2008. At the 2010 Winter Olympics in Vancouver, she finished sixth in the 4 × 5 km relay and 48th in the 10 km event.

At the FIS Nordic World Ski Championships 2009 in Liberec, Bourgeois finished ninth in the 4 × 5 km relay and 28th in the 30 km event.

Her best World Cup finish was eighth in the 4 × 5 km relay twice, both in 2008, while her best individual finish was 21st at a 10 km event in Canada in February 2010.

Cross-country skiing results
All results are sourced from the International Ski Federation (FIS).

Olympic Games

World Championships

World Cup

Season standings

References

External links
 
 
 
 

1983 births
Cross-country skiers at the 2010 Winter Olympics
French female cross-country skiers
Living people
Olympic cross-country skiers of France
French female biathletes
21st-century French women